Dougal Ormonde Walker (January 5, 1890 in the British Virgin Islands – June 28, 1955 in Kansas City, Kansas) was the 10th president of Wilberforce University, serving from 1936 to 1941. He was the 66th bishop of the African Methodist Episcopal Church. 

His daughter, Yvonne Walker-Taylor, served as the 16th president of  Wilberforce University, becoming the first female African American college president in the United States.

References

1890 births
1955 deaths
African Methodist Episcopal bishops
Heads of universities and colleges in the United States
British Virgin Islands emigrants to the United States